St Peter's Cathedral, properly the Cathedral Church of St Peter, is an Anglican cathedral in Tallahassee, Florida, USA, dedicated to Saint Peter and seat of the Bishop of the Gulf Atlantic Diocese of the Anglican Church in North America. It was built in 2012–2014 to provide a home for the young parish of St Peter's Anglican Church, and was made the cathedral of its diocese at the Diocesan Synod on 11 November 2017. From 2018 – 2020, Archbishop Emeritus  Robert Duncan served as Bishop-in-Residence and interim rector of the cathedral.

It is built in a Neo-Gothic style, heavily featuring insulating concrete form construction. Included in the foundations are several handmade bricks from Uganda, which were included to show the importance of the support St. Peter's received in its early years from the Church of Uganda and Bishop Jackson Nzerebende. Building began on 1 December 2012 and was completed just prior to its consecration by Archbishop Robert Duncan on 14 June 2014. In addition to Archbishop Duncan, Bishops Lebhar and Nzerebende were in attendance at the consecration.

Dean and chapter 
As of 1 September 2021:
Dean — The Very Rev'd Marcus Kaiser (since 20 June 2021 installation)
Canon for Adult Formation — The Rev'd Canon Dr. Michael Petty
Canon for Worship — The Rev'd Canon Matthew Wilkins
Canon for Spiritual Formation — The Rev'd Canon Dr. Sudduth Cummings
Canon for Missions & Evangelism — The Rev'd Canon William Krizner

Bells
As of 2021, St Peter's has 4 bells, pitched across an A Major triad, that are hung in the North Tower.

See also
Gothic Revival architecture
Anglican Church in North America

References

Notes

Footnotes

External links

Anglican cathedrals in North America
Churches completed in 2014
Tourist attractions in Tallahassee, Florida
Cathedral
Anglican cathedrals in the United States
Anglican Church in North America church buildings in the United States
Anglican realignment congregations
New Classical architecture